Franco Flores may refer to:

 Franco Flores (footballer, born 1987), Argentine defender
 Franco Flores (footballer, born 1993), Argentine defender